Charity Williams (born October 20, 1996) is a Canadian rugby sevens player.

Biography 
Williams participated in gymnastics during her childhood and wanted to compete on the Olympic stage. She soon realized that her goal of going to the Olympics could not be achieved in gymnastics. In Grade 10 a friend introduced her to rugby, so she decided to attend practice and fell in love with her new-found sport.

In 2016, Williams was named to Canada's first ever women's rugby sevens Olympic team.

Alongside teammates Pam Buisa and Caroline Crossley, Williams represents the national women's sevens team on the Rugby Canada Black, Indigenous, and People of Colour Working Group which was established on July 17, 2020.

In June 2021, Williams was named to Canada's 2020 Summer Olympics team.

Achievements and honours 
 2017, Canada Sevens Langford dream team.

References

External links
 
 
 
 

1996 births
Living people
Canadian female rugby union players
Sportspeople from Toronto
Rugby sevens players at the 2016 Summer Olympics
Olympic rugby sevens players of Canada
Canada international rugby sevens players
Female rugby sevens players
Rugby sevens players at the 2014 Summer Youth Olympics
Canadian people of Jamaican descent
Olympic bronze medalists for Canada
Olympic medalists in rugby sevens
Medalists at the 2016 Summer Olympics
Rugby sevens players at the 2020 Summer Olympics
Youth Olympic silver medalists for Canada
Canada international women's rugby sevens players